James Henderson (1871–1951) from Glasgow, Scotland "is considered to be one of Saskatchewan's pre-eminent first generation artists." Henderson is the subject of a significant retrospective exhibition organized by and first exhibited at the Mendel Art Gallery in 2009. A website dedicated to his life and work has been produced in conjunction with the exhibition, James Henderson: Wicite Owapi Wicasa: the man who paints the old men.

References

External links
http://esask.uregina.ca/entry/henderson_james_1871-1951.html

Artists from Saskatchewan
1951 deaths
1871 births